Epinephelus marginatus, the dusky grouper, yellowbelly rock cod or yellowbelly grouper,  is a species of marine ray-finned fish, a grouper from the subfamily Epinephelinae which is part of the family Serranidae, which also includes the anthias and sea basses. This species is the best known grouper species of the Mediterranean Sea and North Africa coast.

Description 
Epinephelus marginatus is a very large, oval-bodied and large-headed fish with a wide mouth which has a protruding lower jaw. The head and upper body are coloured dark reddish brown or greyish, usually with yellowish gold countershading on the ventral surfaces; the base colour is marked by a vertical series of irregular pale greenish yellow or silvery grey or whitish blotching which is normally rather conspicuous on the body and head; the black maxillary streak varies in its markedness; dark brown median fins; distal edges of the anal and caudal fins and also often pectoral fins have narrow white terminal bands; the pelvic fins are black towards their tips while the pectoral fins are dark reddish-brown or grey; the margin of spiny dorsal fin and basal part of the pectoral fins are often golden yellow in colour. There are eleven spines and 13-16 soft rays in the dorsal fin. This species can grow up to 150 cm in standard length but is more often 90 cm.

Distribution
Epinephelus marginatus has two disjunct distribution centres, the main one is in the eastern Atlantic from the west coast of Iberia south along the western coast of Africa to the Cape of Good Hope, extending east into the south-western Indian Ocean, as far as southern Mozambique, with doubtful records from Madagascar and possibly Oman. It is found throughout the Mediterranean too. The second population occurs in the south western Atlantic off the coast of South America in southern Brazil, Uruguay and northern Argentina. In the eastern Atlantic it is not normally found further north than Portugal but there have been rare records from the Bay of Biscay and in the English Channel as far north as northern France, Great Britain and Ireland.

Habitat 
Epinephelus marginatus  is demersal, normally found in and around rocky reefs from surface waters down to as much as 300 metres in depth. It often occurs in the vicinity of beds of Posidonia sea grass. Juveniles are generally found more inshore than the adult fish, even being found in rock pools. Where they are protected, in marine nature reserves and no take zones, both adults and juveniles occur in shallow waters, but the depths at which juveniles are found is always shallower than the preferred depths of adults.

Biology
Epinephelus marginatus adults are solitary and territorial, preferring areas with a rocky substrate but both adults and juveniles will enter brackish waters, such as estuaries. Their main food is molluscs, crustaceans, and octopuses. But as they grow larger other fish form an increasingly important part of their diet, with reef fish being preferred.

E. marginatus is a protogynous hermaphrodite, meaning that all fish begin adult life as females but as they grow larger and older they develop into males. They attain sexual maturity at quite a late age, females begin to breed when they are around five years of age, and then between their 9th and 16th years they change into males, most commonly at 12. The fish start to transform into males at a length of 65 cm, although most change sex when they are between 80 and 90 cm in total length. In some populations the presence of large female fish suggests that not all females change sex. During the breeding season small clusters of a few tens of individuals form at specific spawning sites, an exception to their normally solitary existence. Known sites where E. marginatus traditionally gather to spawn include the Medes Islands Marine Reserve in Spain, off Lampedusa in Italy and Port-Cros National Park in France, all in the Mediterranean; fishermen in Brazil suspect there are aggregations off the coast of Santa Catarina but so far none has been definitely found. In the Mediterranean spawning lasts from June to September, mating is polygynous and the spawning clusters normally have seven females to each male. Off Brazil E. marginatus reproduces in the early summer, between November and December. While spawning, the dominant males set up territories and aggressively defend them from neighbouring males and smaller females. They are reported to live for up to 50 years.

Taxonomy
Epinephelus marginatus was first formally described as Serranus marginatus in 1834 by the English  botanist, ichthyologist, malacologist and clergyman Richard Thomas Lowe (1802-1874) with the type locality given as "off Madeira". The name Perca gigas was coined by the Danish zoologist Morten Thrane Brünnich (1737-1827) in 1768 but was unused and some authorities are of the view that this name should be suppressed by the International Commission on Zoological Nomenclature.

Fishing 
Epinephelus marginatus is a popular food fish and is caught across its range by commercial fishermen while large adult fish are targeted as trophies by spear-fishing, and is readily taken by anglers. The slow growth rate of this species and its particular mode of reproduction make it vulnerable to over-exploitation, for example the targeting of large males by spear fishers may skew the sex ratio even further and affect reproductive productivity. There have been attempts to grow and breed this fish in aquaculture in Italy.

In some countries the dusky grouper is considered a delicacy. Referring to its preference among restaurant guests, the Spanish say 'De la mar el mero y de la tierra el carnero' (From the sea the dusky grouper, from the land the lamb).

Conservation
Epinephelus marginatus catch declined by 88% in seven countries between 1990–2001, these countries forming a significant part of its overall distribution. In other regions, such as West Africa, where this species is heavily exploited, there is little data about the status of this fish. For these reasons, the International Union for Conservation of Nature has assessed E. marginatus as being Vulnerable, citing a suspected reduction in the population size reduction in excess 50% over the last three generations and where the causes of the decline continue. Conservation measures have included a spearfishing ban for ten years in France and bag limits in South Africa. In addition, a number of Marine Protected Areas have been established to protect the habitat of E. marginatus. In Turkey recommended actions have included no take zones along the Aegean and Mediterranean Sea coasts and a total fisheries ban for a minimum of 3–5 years.

References

External resources
 

marginatus
Fish described in 1834
Taxonomy articles created by Polbot